Dollon is a commune in the Sarthe department in the Pays de la Loire region in the northwest of France.

See also
Communes of the Sarthe department

References

Communes of Sarthe